Nguyễn Quốc Cường (born 1982) is the People's Council Chairman of Bắc Giang Province of Vietnam.

References

Living people
Vietnamese politicians
1952 births
Members of the 9th Central Committee of the Communist Party of Vietnam
Members of the 10th Central Committee of the Communist Party of Vietnam
Members of the 11th Central Committee of the Communist Party of Vietnam